A travelling microscope is an instrument for measuring length with a resolution typically in the order of 0.01mm. The precision is such that better-quality instruments have measuring scales made from Invar to avoid misreadings due to thermal effects. The instrument comprises a microscope mounted on two rails fixed to, or part of a very rigid bed. The position of the microscope can be varied coarsely by sliding along the rails, or finely by turning a screw. The eyepiece is fitted with fine cross-hairs to fix a precise position, which is then read off the vernier scale. Some instruments, such as that produced in the 1960s by the Precision Tool and Instrument Company of Thornton Heath, Surrey, England, also measure vertically. The purpose of the microscope is to aim at reference marks with much higher accuracy than is possible using the naked eye. It is used in laboratories to measure the refractive index of flat specimens using the geometrical concepts of ray optics (Duc de Chaulnes’ method). It is also used to measure very short distances precisely, for example the diameter of a capillary tube. This mechanical instrument has now largely been superseded by electronic- and optically based measuring devices that are both very much more accurate and considerably cheaper to produce.

Travelling microscope consists of a cast iron base with machined-Vee-top surface and is fitted with three levelling screws. A metallic carriage, clamped to a spring-loaded bar slides with its attached vernier and reading lens along an inlaid strip of metal scale. The scale is divided in half millimeters. Fine adjustments are made by means of a micrometer screw for taking accurate reading. Both vernier reading to 0.01mm or 0.02mm. Microscope tube consists of 10x Eyepice and 15mm or 50mm or 75mm objectives. The Microscope, with its rack and pinion attachment is mounted on a vertical slide, which too, runs with an attached vernier along the vertical scale. The microscope is free to rotate n vertical plane. The vertical guide bar is coupled to the horizontal carriage of the microscope. for holding objects a horizontal stage made of a milki conolite sheet is provided in the base.

See also 

 Cathetometer

References

Microscopes
Microbiology equipment
Length, distance, or range measuring devices